Chewiness is the mouthfeel sensation of labored chewing due to sustained, elastic resistance from the food.  Foods typically considered chewy include caramel, rare steak, and chewing gum.  Other foods where this is an important part of the experience of eating include springy cheeses and apples.

Chewiness is empirically measured by the metrics of chew count and chew rate.

References

Further reading 

  Comments on the use of the word "chewiness" by Alina Surmacka Szczesniak, formerly Principal Scientist, General Foods Technical Center, and founding editor of Journal of Texture Studies.
 

Gustatory system
Gustation